Kidwaipuri also known as P&T colony, is a neighbourhood of Patna. It is centrally located residential colony of Patna, adjacent to Nageshwar Colony. Sri Krishna Nagar, Buddha colony and Patna Women's College mark other boundaries of Kidwaipuri. This area is under the jurisdiction of Kotwali police station of Patna Police.

Transport
It is 2.5 km away from Patna Junction railway station and about 3.5 km away from Patna Airport.

Landmarks
Kidwaipuri is well planned small colony with the apartments and commercial centers located near Nageshwar colony due its proximity to Boring Road and Boring Canal Road.
Planetarium  (100 m)
Patna High Court  (250 m)
Boring Road Crossing (1 Km)
Patna Junction  (2.5 km)
Sanjay Gandhi Biological Park ZOO (2.5 Km)
Inome Tax Office  (100 m) 
Patna Museum Campus  (0.3 km)
Adalatganj  (0.4 km)
Patna Women's College  (0.5 km)
Nageshwar colony  (0.8 km)
Mount Carmel High School, Patna  (0.8 km)
New Patna Club  (0.9 km)
Patna G.P.O Campus  (1 km)
Mithapur Railway Over Bridge  (1.1 km)
Hardinge Park  (1.1 km)
R Block  (1.3 km)
Rajendra Path  (1.7 km)
R.L.S. Yadav College of Pharmacy
Patliputra junction (9.0 km)
Danapur Station (11.7 km)

References

Neighbourhoods in Patna